Aleksandar Despić (January 6, 1927–April 7, 2005) was a Serbian physicist and academic. Despić received his PhD degree from the Imperial College of Science and Technology, London. He was a professor at the Faculty of Technology, University of Belgrade and his scientific interests include fundamental and applied electrochemistry. He was the President of the Serbian Academy of Sciences and Arts from 1994 to 1998.

Selected works
 A.R.Despic, K.I.Popov, Transport Controlled Deposition and Dissolution of Metals, Modern Aspects of Electrochemistry, Plenum Press, New York, 1972, Vol.7, Ch.4
 A.R.Despic, Deposition and Dissolution of Metals and Alloys, part B: Mechanism, Kinetics, Texture and Morphology, in: Comprehensive Treatise on Electrochemιstry, ed. J.O.M.Bockris, B.E.Conway, E.Yeager, Plenum Press, New York, 1983, Vol.7, Ch.7b
 A.Despic, V.Parkhutik, Electrochemistry of Aluminium in Aqueous Solutions and Physics of Its Anodic Oxides, in: Modern Aspects of Electrochemistry, ed. J.O.M.Bockris, R.E.White, B.E.Conway, Plenum Press, New York, 1989, Vol.20, Ch.6.
 A.R.Despic, The use of aluminium in energy conversion and storage, in: Chemistry and Energy - I, ed.C.A.C.Sequeira, Sintra (Portugal), 1990. (Materials science monographs, 65.)
 A.R.Despic, V.D.Jovic, Electrochemical Deposition and Dissolution of Alloys and Metal Composites - Fundamentals Aspects, Modern Aspects of Electrochemistry, Plenum Press, New York, 1995, Vol.27, Ch.2.

Sources
 Serbian Academy of Sciences and Arts)

See also
 Pavle Simić
 Milan Vukcevich
 Bogdan Đuričić
 Ljubisav Rakić
 Ivan Gutman
 Sima Lozanić
 Marko Leko
 Mihailo Rašković
 Jivojin Jocic
 Aleksandar M. Leko
 Milivoje Lozanić
 Dejan Popović Jekić
 Panta Tutundžić
 Vukić Mićović
 Persida Ilić
 Svetozar Lj. Jovanović
 Djordje K. Stefanović

References 

Serbian chemists
1927 births
2005 deaths
Members of the European Academy of Sciences and Arts
Academic staff of the University of Belgrade